Mohabbat Tujhe Alvida is a Pakistani melodrama television series produced by Barkat Siddiqi and Zayed Sheikh. It stars Zahid Ahmed, Sonya Hussain, and Mansha Pasha in lead roles. The show is loosely based on the folk tale of Lila Chanesar.

Summary 
Ulfat (Sonya Hussyn) belongs to a middle-class family and dreams of becoming rich. She meets Shafaq (Mansha Pasha) who is a rich businesswoman and, in order for Ulfat to succeed in her dreams, she chooses to risk her marital life, causing many problems for her.

Cast 

 Zahid Ahmed  Shahaan
 Sonya Hussyn as Ulfat
 Mansha Pasha as Shafaq
 Jawed Sheikh as Wajahat, Shafaq's father
 Sajida Syed as Farzana, Shahaan's mother
 Mizna Waqas as Noori
 Hassam Khan as Mansoor
 Angeline Malik as Mrs Ikhlaaq
 Anosha Ali as Bano
 Muzaina Malik

Production 
In November 2018, it was revealed that Barkat Siddiqui is working on a project called Aye Dil Zara Sambhal. The title of the show was later changed to Mohabbat Tujhe Alvida. Zahid Ahmed was cast in the lead role. He played the role of Shahaan, an average middle-class man who is working hard to create comfort in the lives of his wife Ulfat (played by Sonya Hussain) and children. Mansha Pasha played the character of Shafaq, a rich and glamorous girl. The role was initially offered to Armeena Khan but due to unknown reasons, probably date clashes, she was replaced by Pasha. It was Mansha Pasha and Zahid Ahmed's second on-screen appearance together after Tau Dil Ka Kiya Hua while Zahid also collaborated with Sonya Hussain for the second time after Ishq Zahe Naseeb.

Criticism 
After the release of the first and second teaser, the show was heavily criticised for its typical melodramatic story. The viewers also called it a copy of the Indian film Judaai to which Pasha clarified and responded that "the show may be inspired but we have our own folktales", and hinted the show was based on Lilan Chanesar by showing the details of the article.

Soundtrack

The title song of Mohabbat Tujhe Alvida was composed and performed by musician Sahir Ali Bagga with Afshan Fawad being in the chorus. Lyrics for the song were given by Major Imran Raza. It marked Bagga's return to Hum TV, since he performed the channel's Deewar-e-Shabs title song "Kya Hai Ishq" in 2019. The first half of the soundtrack was released on 12 June and the complete OST released on 17 June 2020.

References

External links 
Official website

2020 Pakistani television series debuts
Pakistani television series
Romantic comedy television series
Urdu-language television shows
Hum TV
Hum TV original programming
Pakistani romantic drama television series
Pakistani drama television series